ScotCen Social Research is the Scottish branch of the United Kingdom’s largest centre for independent social research, NatCen Social Research. 

Based in Edinburgh, ScotCen Social Research is a not-for-profit organisation. Employees include survey methodologists, data analysts and expert quantitative and qualitative researchers. It is commissioned by governments and charities to investigate public opinion about social issues. 

The Centre is known for conducting fieldwork and reporting on studies including the annual Scottish Health Survey, the Scottish Social Attitudes survey, and the Growing Up in Scotland longitudinal study. 

The research conducted covers:

 Children and young people
 Communities
 Families
 Crime and justice
 Equality and diversity
 Health and wellbeing
 Housing
 Income and work
 Schools, education and training
 Social and political attitudes
 Transport

References 

Demographics of the United Kingdom
Demographics organizations
Social sciences organizations